Vep may refer to:

 vep, the ISO 639-3 code for the Veps language
 Vép, a town in Vas County, Hungary

VEP may refer to:

 Variable electro-precipitator, a waste water remediation unit using electrocoagulation
 Visual evoked potential,  a nervous response to light
 Venus Entry Probe, the former name of the European Venus Explorer
 Voluntary Euthanasia Party, in Australia
 Voter Education Project, a 1960s U.S. organisation for distributing funds to the civil rights movement
 Signature of Victor E. Pazmiño, an American cartoonist
 British Rail Class 423, aka "4Vep", "4VEP" or simply "VEP"
 , a bioinformatic tool
 Vulnerabilities Equities Process, used by the U.S. government to determine its response to security vulnerabilities

See also
 Veps (disambiguation)